The Poet of the Peaks is a 1915 American short film directed by  B. Reeves Eason. The film is based upon the John Keats poem "La Belle Dame sans Merci".

Cast
 Louise Lester
 David Lythgoe
 Jack Richardson
 Vivian Rich
 Harry von Meter

External links

1915 films
1915 short films
American silent short films
American black-and-white films
Films based on poems
Films directed by B. Reeves Eason
1910s American films